Sound Barrier is a 2005 film by the Iranian director Amir Naderi. The screenplay was written by Abou Farman, Heather Murphy and Naderi himself and featured Louise Flory, Frank Glacken, Jeremy X Halpern, Charlie Wilson in the principal acting roles. The film is regarded as the last one of Naderi's New York period. It won prizes in film festivals in Rome and Turin.

References

Iranian drama films
2005 films